Akeman Street is the name given to a Roman road in eastern England that runs from Cambridgeshire to the north coast of Norfolk.

Akeman Street joined Ermine Street near Wimpole Hall, then ran northeast to the settlement at Durolipons (now Cambridge), where it crossed a Roman road now known as the Via Devana. Within north Cambridge, the road followed the present-day Stretten Avenue, Carlton Way and Mere Way running northeast past Landbeach before joining the present A10 and on towards Ely and The Fens. It then reached Denver and the coast at Brancaster.

The road was constructed on top of an earlier trackway some time in the 2nd Century CE, or later, and it has been speculated that it was part of the creation of an imperial estate under Hadrian.

See also 

 Akeman Street
 Roman roads in Britain

References 

Roman roads in England